Dori Hauck is an American farmer, teacher, and politician currently serving in the North Dakota House of Representatives from North Dakota's 36th district. She was appointed to the seat after incumbent Republican Luke Simons was expelled from the house due to misconduct. She was selected to replace Simons and was sworn in on March 16, 2022.

References

Living people
Republican Party members of the North Dakota House of Representatives
21st-century American politicians
21st-century American women politicians
Year of birth missing (living people)